Anthony O'Sullivan (1855July 5, 1920) was an American silent film actor and film director. He appeared in more than 160 films between 1906 and 1918. He also directed 35 films between 1913 and 1915. He died in The Bronx, New York

Director

 The Wrong Bottle (1913)
 The Stolen Bride (1913)
 A Frightful Blunder (1913)
 The Mirror (1913)
 Olaf—An Atom (1913)
 A Dangerous Foe (1913)
 The Well (1913)
 The Switch Tower (1913)
 In Diplomatic Circles (1913)
 A Gamble with Death (1913)
 A Gambler's Honor (1913)
 The Vengeance of Galora (1913)
 When Love Forgives (1913)
 Under the Shadow of the Law (1913)
 I Was Meant for You (1913)
 The Crook and the Girl (1913)
 The Strong Man's Burden (1913)
 The Stolen Treaty (1913)
 The Law and His Son (1913)
 A Tender-Hearted Crook (1913)
 The Van Nostrand Tiara (1913)
 The Stopped Clock (1913)
 All for Science (1913)
 The Cracksman's Gratitude (1914)
 The Way Out (1915)
 Her Convert (1915)
 Old Offenders (1915)
 As It Happened (1915)

Actor

 The Black Hand (1906)
 A Calamitous Elopement (1908)
 The Fight for Freedom (1908)
 The Greaser's Gauntlet (1908)
 The Fatal Hour (1908)
 Monday Morning in a Coney Island Police Court (1908)
 The Red Girl (1908)
 The Pirate's Gold (1908)
 The Kentuckian (1908)
 Mrs. Jones Entertains (1909)
 The Lonely Villa (1909)
 The Hessian Renegades (1909)
 Pippa Passes (1909)
 Nursing a Viper (1909)
 The Death Disc: A Story of the Cromwellian Period (1909)
 The Red Man's View (1909)
 A Trap for Santa (1909)
 In Little Italy (1909)
 The Day After (1909)
 Choosing a Husband (1909)
 Two Memories (1909)
 The Rocky Road (1910)
 The Two Brothers (1910)
 Ramona (1910)
 What the Daisy Said (1910)
A Flash of Light (1910)
 The Modern Prodigal (1910) as At Farewell
 A Mohawk's Way (1910) as Trapper
 The Goddess of Sagebrush Gulch (1912)
 Old Offenders (1915)
 The Pullman Bride (1917)

References

External links

 scene from Mrs. Jones Entertains, 1909; l to r: Jeannie McPherson, Florence Lawrence, John Cumpson, Anthony O'Sullivan

1855 births
1920 deaths
Place of birth missing
People from the Bronx
American male film actors
20th-century American male actors
Film directors from New York City
Irish emigrants to the United States (before 1923)